Jan Broda (born 1940) is a retired Czechoslovak long and triple jumper.

He finished tenth at the 1970 European Indoor Championships and fourteenth at the 1971 European Indoor Championships.

He became Czechoslovak champion triple jump champion in 1970, and long jump champion in 1965, 1968 and 1969. He became Czechoslovak indoor champion in 1969, 1970, 1971 and 1973 and long jump champion in 1970.

References

1940 births
Living people
Czechoslovak male triple jumpers
Czechoslovak male long jumpers